Devonte Smith (born July 30, 1993) is an American mixed martial artist who competed in the Lightweight division of the Ultimate Fighting Championship.

Background
Smith started training mixed martial arts around the age of 14 after seeing Quinton Jackson fight in PRIDE. He attended Bedford High School where he wrestled every year.

Mixed martial arts career

Early career
After compiling an amateur record of 7–2–1, Smith started his professional MMA career in 2015 and fought primarily in Ohio. He amassed a record of 7–1 before competing in Dana White's Contender Series web-series program.

Dana White's Contender Series
Smith appeared in Dana White's Contender Series 16 on August 7, 2018, facing Joseph Lowry. He won the fight via knockout in the first round.

Ultimate Fighting Championship
Smith made his UFC debut on November 10, 2018, against Julian Erosa at UFC Fight Night: The Korean Zombie vs. Rodríguez. He won the fight via knockout in round one.

His next fight came on February 9, 2019, at UFC 234 against Dong Hyun Ma. He won the fight via technical knockout in round one.  The win earned him the Performance of the Night bonus.

Smith was scheduled to face John Makdessi on August 17, 2019, at UFC 241. However, it was reported on July 30 that Makdessi was forced to withdraw for undisclosed reasons. Returning veteran Clay Collard was briefly linked as the replacement. In turn, Collard was removed from the bout during the week leading up to the event due to an undisclosed medical issue and he was replaced by promotional newcomer Khama Worthy. He lost the fight via technical knockout in round one.

Smith was expected to face Alex da Silva Coelho on February 6, 2021, at UFC Fight Night 184. However, Coelho pulled out due to undisclosed reasons, and was replaced by Justin Jaynes. Smith won the fight via technical knockout in round two.

Smith faced Jamie Mullarkey on October 2, 2021, at UFC Fight Night 193. He lost the fight via technical knockout in round two.

Smith was scheduled to face Erick Gonzalez on March 5, 2022, at UFC 272. However, Gonzalez was forced to withdraw from the event due to foot injuries and was replaced by Ľudovít Klein. Smith lost the fight via split decision.

In May 2022, it was reported that Smith was released by the UFC.

Personal life
While preparing for his fight against Khama Worthy, Smith's sister Dariene was killed by a stray bullet in Columbus, Ohio, on July 11, 2020.

Championships and accomplishments

Mixed martial arts
Ultimate Fighting Championship
Performance of the Night (One time)

Mixed martial arts record

|-
|Loss
|align=center|11–4
|Ľudovít Klein
|Decision (split)
|UFC 272
|
|align=center|3
|align=center|5:00
|Las Vegas, Nevada, United States
|
|-
|Loss
| align=center| 11–3
| Jamie Mullarkey
| TKO (punches)
| UFC Fight Night: Santos vs. Walker
| 
| align=center| 2
| align=center| 2:51
| Las Vegas, Nevada, United States
| 
|-
|Win
|align=center|11–2
|Justin Jaynes
|TKO (doctor stoppage)
|UFC Fight Night: Overeem vs. Volkov
|
|align=center|2
|align=center|3:38
|Las Vegas, Nevada, United States
|
|-
|Loss
|align=center|10–2
|Khama Worthy
|TKO (punches)
|UFC 241
|
|align=center|1
|align=center|4:15
|Anaheim, California, United States
|
|-
|Win
|align=center|10–1
|Dong Hyun Ma
|TKO (punches)
|UFC 234
|
|align=center|1
|align=center|3:53
|Melbourne, Australia
|
|-
|Win
|align=center|9–1
|Julian Erosa
|KO (punches)
|UFC Fight Night: The Korean Zombie vs. Rodríguez
|
|align=center|1
|align=center|0:46
|Denver, Colorado, United States
|
|-
|Win
|align=center|8–1
|Joseph Lowry
|KO (elbows)
|Dana White's Contender Series 16
|
|align=center|1
|align=center|2:52
|Las Vegas, United States
|
|-
|Win
|align=center|7–1
|Justin Edwards
|KO (punches)
|Iron Tiger Fight Series / Alliance MMA
|
|align=center|1
|align=center|1:30
|Columbus, Ohio, United States
|
|-
|Win
|align=center|6–1
|Nick Gehrts
|TKO (punches)
|V3 Fights 65
|
|align=center|4
|align=center|1:03
|Memphis, Tennessee, United States
|
|-
|Win
|align=center|5–1
|Damonte Robinson
|Submission (triangle choke)
|IT Fight Series 74
|
|align=center|1
|align=center|2:54
|Akron, Ohio, United States
|
|-
|Loss
|align=center|4–1
|John Gunther
|TKO (punches)
|RFO: Big Guns 22
|
|align=center|3
|align=center|2:29
|Mansfield, Ohio, United States
|
|-
|Win
|align=center|4–0
|Xavier Nash
|TKO (punches)
|Pinnacle FC 14
|
|align=center|3
|align=center|0:50
|Cheswick, Pennsylvania, United States
|
|-
|Win
|align=center|3–0
|Fred Stonehouse
|KO (punches)
|GOTC MMA 21
|
|align=center|1
|align=center|3:01
|Pittsburgh, Pennsylvania, United States
|
|-
|Win
|align=center|2–0
|Mike Wiseman
|TKO (punches)
|Caged Madness 40
|
|align=center|2
|align=center|2:42
|Akron, Ohio, United States
|
|-
|Win
|align=center|1–0
|John Mosley
|TKO (punches)
|Caged Madness 38
|
|align=center|1
|align=center|4:29
|Akron, Ohio, United States
|
|-

See also
List of male mixed martial artists

References

External links
 
 

1993 births
Living people
Lightweight mixed martial artists
Mixed martial artists utilizing Brazilian jiu-jitsu
Sportspeople from Cleveland
Mixed martial artists from Ohio
American male mixed martial artists
American practitioners of Brazilian jiu-jitsu
Ultimate Fighting Championship male fighters